Lansdowne Valley Park, or sometimes Landsdowne Valley Park, is a linear public park in Drimnagh, Dublin. The River Camac flows through it, and it is part of the Green Loop Trail. There is a municipal pitch and putt course in the park.

References

Parks in Dublin (city)
Linear parks